Two Headed Eagle is a 1960 Australian television play directed by William Sterling and starring Margo Lee. It was based on a play by Jean Cocteau which had been first presented on the London stage in 1946. The adaptation was by Alan Seymour who wrote a number of TV plays around this time. The play had been produced with Tallulah Bankhead.

Premise
In a fictitious European country, a Queen has been mourning her dead husband for the ten years since he was assassinated. A peasant-poet assassin, Stanislas, sets out to kill her. He is unable to do so after she greets him calmly and he winds up falling for the Queen, which costs him his life.

Cast
 Edward Brayshaw as the assassin Stanislas
 Margo Lee as the Queen
 Michael Duffield as Felix von Willenstein		
 Christopher Hill as Christopher Von Foehn, the police chief		
 Madeline Howell as Edith Von Berg, the Queen's reader		
Joe Jenkins  as Tony

Production
Costumes were by John Peters. The production was shot in Melbourne in 1960 though not broadcast in Sydney until the following year. It featured a 15 minute speech by Margo Lee.

Reception
The Age said it was a "personal triumph" for Lee.

The TV critic for The Sydney Morning Herald praised Margo Lee's performance but thought the play "could have been more effective if there had been a little more care in the production. The camera work relied too much on ordinary close and long shots; there was nothing much, in this respect, to enliven proceedings during the queen's long vocal cadenza; and the quality of the sound-reproduction was variable."

See also
List of television plays broadcast on Australian Broadcasting Corporation (1960s)

References

External links

Films based on works by Jean Cocteau
Australian television plays
Australian Broadcasting Corporation original programming
English-language television shows
Black-and-white Australian television shows
Australian live television shows
1961 television plays
Films directed by William Sterling (director)